Scheibel is German surname:

Arnold Bernard Scheibel (1923–2017), American neuroscientist
 Gottfried Ephraim Scheibel (1696–1759), German theologian and writer about music
 James Scheibel (born 1947), American politician
 Johann Gottfried Scheibel (1783–1843), a German Lutheran leader
  (born 1964, in Schönebeck (Elbe)), German footballer
 Oscar Scheibel (1881–1953), German beetle collector

Scheibl 
 Eligius Scheibl, Austrian politician
  (born 1952, Gmunden), Austrian painter

Schaible 
  (1870, Freiburg im Breisgau - 1933), German civil servant
 Grace Berg Schaible, née Berg (1925, Tacoma, Washington), the first female state's attorney general
 Ivo Schaible (1912, Laupheim - 1990), German religious leader and artist

German-language surnames